The 2010 National Hurling League (known as the Allianz National Hurling League for sponsorship reasons) was the 79th season of the National Hurling League. 35 teams competed in the league.

Galway were the champions, defeating Cork in the final.

Teams

Team summaries

Format

The 2010 format of the National Hurling League is a system consisting of five divisions. There are thirty-five teams competing: Divisions One and Two have eight teams in each, Division Three A contains six, Division Three B seven, and there are six teams in Division Four.

Division 1

Division 1 contains eight teams. Each team plays all the others once. The top two play the final; the winners of the final are the 2010 NHL champions. The last-placed team is relegated.

Division 2

Division 2 contains eight teams. Each team plays all the others once. The top two play the final; the winners of the final are the 2010 Division Two champions and are promoted. The last-placed team is relegated to Division 3A.

Division 3A
Division 3A contains six teams. The top two teams shall contest the final; the winners of the final are the 2010 Division Three champions and are promoted. The last-placed team is relegated to Division 3B.

Division 3B

Division 3B contains seven teams. The top two teams shall contest the final; the winners of the final are the 2010 Division 3B champions and are promoted to Division 3A. The last-placed team is relegated.

Division 4
Division 4 contains six teams. Each team plays all the others once. The top two play the final; the winners of the final are the 2010 Division Four champions and are promoted to Division 3B.

Division 1

Kilkenny came into the season as defending champions of the 2009 season. Offaly entered Division 1 as the promoted team.

On 2 May 2010, Galway won the title following a 2–22 to 1–17 win over Cork in the final. It was their first league title since 2004 and their 9th National League title overall.

Limerick, who lost all of their group stage matches, were relegated from Division 1. Wexford won Division 2 and secured promotion to the top tier.

Offaly's Shane Dooley was the Division 1 top scorer with 6-57.

Table

Group stage

Knock-out stage

Final

Scoring statistics

Top scorers overall

Top scorers in a single game

Division 2

Clare and Kildare entered Division 2 as the respective relegated and promoted teams from the 2009 season.

On 2 May 2010, Wexford won the title following a 1–16 to 2–9 win over Clare in the final.

Kildare were relegated from Division 2 after losing all but one of their group stage matches. They spent just one season in Division 2.

Wexford's Diarmuid Lyng was the Division 2 top scorer with 1-58.

Table

Group stage

Knock-out stage

Final

Scoring statistics

Top scorers overall

Top scorers in a single game

Division 3A

Kerry and London entered Division 3A as the respective relegated and promoted teams from the 2010 season.

On 10 April 2010, Kerry won the title following a 2–18 to 1–15 win over Derry in the final.

Mayo were relegated from Division 3A after losing all but one of their group stage matches.

London's Martin Finn was the Division 3A top scorer with 2-27.

Table

Group stage

Knock-out stage

Final

Scoring statistics

Top scorers overall

Top scorers in a single game

Division 3B

Table

Knock-out stage

Final

Division 4

Table

Knock-out stage

Final

Monaghan won promotion to Division 3B for 2011 while Longford remained in Division 4 for 2011

External links
Fixtures on gaa.ie
2010 National Hurling League Fixtures and Results
National Hurling League 2010 at gaainfo.com

References

 
National Hurling League seasons